West Sonora is an unincorporated community in Preble County, in the U.S. state of Ohio.

History
A former variant name was Sonora. Sonora had its start around 1852, when the railroad was extended to that point. A post office called West Sonora was established in 1855, and remained in operation until 1940.

References

Unincorporated communities in Preble County, Ohio
Unincorporated communities in Ohio